The incumbent ambassador is Julissa Reynoso Pantaleón, she was sworn in by Vice President Kamala Harris on January 7, 2022 and presented her credentials on February 2, 2022.

This is a list of United States ambassadors to Spain from 1779 to the present day. The ambassador to Spain is also credentialed to Andorra.

Chiefs of Mission

Other Nominees

Notes

See also
Spain – United States relations
Foreign relations of Spain
Ambassadors of the United States
List of ambassadors of Spain to the United States

References
United States Department of State: Background notes on Spain

External links
 United States Department of State: Chiefs of Mission for Spain
 United States Department of State: Spain
 United States Embassy in Madrid

Spain
 
United States